The Oxometrical Society was founded in 1942 by engineers at the University of Sydney. A plaque of Oxometrical Society was erected in the University of Sydney in recognition of the society. In 2018 the plaque was removed and placed in the University Archives with the records of the Society when the area was re-developed.

A society of the same name exists in London. The symbol of the society is a bull. In 1944 the Oxometrical Society of Sydney University awarded the degree of Doctor to Ern Malley for having shown himself a notable producer of oxoplasm. Music critic Neville Cardus, whose address on the ‘Oxometrical Aspects of Moronology’ was made a doctor and also received the Order of the Golden Horn by the society. 

Ronald N. Bracewell was the President of the Oxometrical Society while working in the Engineering Department of the University of Sydney.
In 1996 Sandy Halley submitted a thesis to become the first female member accepted into the Oxometrical Society.

References

University of Sydney